KS Morze Bałtyk Szczecin was a Polish volleyball team based in Szczecin, founded in 1973. Two–time Polish Champion (1985, 1987). In 2014, the club was replaced by Espadon Szczecin, later known as Stocznia Szczecin.

Honours
 Polish Championship
Winners (2): 1984–85, 1986–87

Former names

References

External links

Polish volleyball clubs
Sport in Szczecin
Volleyball clubs established in 1973
1973 establishments in Poland